This is the discography for American musician Dion DiMucci (including Dion and the Belmonts).

Dion is a singer and songwriter whose music has incorporated elements of doo-wop, rock, R&B and blues. As lead singer of Dion and the Belmonts, then a solo career, he was one of the most popular rock and roll performers of the pre-British Invasion era. He had 39 Top 40 hits in the late 1950s and early 1960s as a solo performer, with the Belmonts or with the Del-Satins. He is best known for the singles "Runaround Sue", "The Wanderer", "Ruby Baby" and "Lovers Who Wander", among other hits.
 
In the late 1960s, Dion shifted his style and released songs that were more mature and contemplative, such as "Abraham, Martin and John". During the 1980s, Dion produced several Christian albums, earning a GMA Dove Award nomination in 1984 for the album I Put Away My Idols. He returned to secular music in the late 1980s with Yo Frankie (1989). Between the mid-2000s and 2021, Dion released six Top Blues Albums. Critics who had dismissed his early work, labeling him a teen idol, praised his later work and noted the influence he has had on other musicians. 
 
A Grammy-nominated artist, Dion has released over 40 albums, and scored eleven Top 10 hits (including with the Belmonts) on the Billboard Hot 100 chart. He was inducted into the Rock and Roll Hall of Fame in 1989. In 2002, Dion was inducted into the Grammy Hall of Fame for "Runaround Sue". Recent album awards include Favorite Blues Album for New York is My Home (2016), Favorite Compilations and Reissues for Kickin Child: Lost Columbia Album 1965 (2017) and Favorite Blues Album for Blues with Friends (2020).

Albums

Dion and the Belmonts

Dion 

Dion released a music video for every song from Blues with Friends (2020) and Stomping Ground (2021) via social media.

Compilation albums

Singles 
Dion and the Belmonts

Dion

"Hello Christmas" (with Amy Grant) and "You Know It's Christmas" (with Joe Bonamassa) were released in 2020.

Billboard Year-End performances

Dion and the Belmonts

Dion

References 

Discographies of American artists
Pop music discographies
Rhythm and blues discographies
Rock music discographies